Sulcopyrenula is a genus of fungi in the family Pyrenulaceae.

References

External links
Sulcopyrenula at Index Fungorum

Pyrenulales
Eurotiomycetes genera